The Corkman is a weekly Irish newspaper.

It is part of the Corkman Group and based in Mallow.  It is owned by the Independent News & Media group.  The paper is primarily a North Cork newspaper, and also publishes a separate edition for Muskerry (Macroom - Ballincollig area). Its slogan is "Your news for the life you live", which has been in use since February 2008.

According to the Audit Bureau of Circulations, it had an average circulation of 7,473 between June 2004 and January 2005.

External links

Independent News & Media
Mallow, County Cork
Mass media in County Cork
Newspapers published in the Republic of Ireland
Weekly newspapers published in Ireland